CD69 (Cluster of Differentiation 69) is a human transmembrane C-Type lectin protein encoded by the  gene. It is an early activation marker that is expressed in hematopoietic stem cells, T cells, and many other cell types in the immune system. It is also implicated in T cell differentiation as well as lymphocyte retention in lymphoid organs.

Function 

The activation of T lymphocytes and Natural Killer (NK) cells, both in vivo and in vitro, induces expression of CD69. This molecule, which appears to be the earliest inducible cell surface glycoprotein acquired during lymphoid activation, is involved in lymphocyte proliferation and functions as a signal-transmitting receptor in lymphocytes, including natural killer (NK) cells, and platelets (Cambiaggi et al., 1992) [supplied by OMIM].

Structure and ligands 
The gene encoding CD69 is located in the NK gene complex on chromosome 6 and chromosome 12 in mice and humans respectively. Activation signaling pathways in lymphocytes, NK cells, dendritic cells and other cell types upregulate transcription factors, such as NF-κB, ERG-1 (erythroblast transformation-specific related gene-1), and AP-1 (activator protein), in order to promote the transcription of the CD69 gene. The CD69 protein is subject to post-translational modifications. Namely, it is differentially glycosylated to produce either a 28 kDa peptide or a 32 kDa peptide. Two of these peptides randomly combine to form a homodimer linked by a disulfide bond. These subunits have a C-type lectin domain (CTLD) that binds ligands, a transmembrane domain, and a cytoplasmic tail that relays signals to the cell interior.

CD69 lacks the characteristic Ca2+ binding residues in CTLDs, indicating that it might bind to proteins rather than carbohydrates, the usual ligand of CTLDs. It has been shown that CD69 binds to Gal-1, a carbohydrate binding protein located on some dendritic cells and macrophages, in addition to Myl9/12. Other ligands have yet to be identified. However, it is known that binding of the ligands initiates the Jak/Stat signaling pathway as well as the mTOR/HIF1-α pathway. CD69 is also known to interact with and mediate S1P and LAT1 receptors, which influence lymphocyte egress in lymphoid organs among other responses. More work must be done to fully characterize CD69-ligand interactions as well as CD69's method of transducing intracellular signals.

T cell differentiation 
CD69 expression has been associated with both regulatory T cell (Treg), memory T cell and Bcl6 loCD69 hiLZ GC B plasmablast precursors. Treg precursors exit the thymus expressing CD69 and complete differentiation into Treg cells in peripheral tissues when they encounter antigens and other cytokines, like IL-2.  Through the JAK/STAT signaling pathway, CD69 activation also induces the production of TGF-β as well as IL-2, which contribute to the differentiation of Treg cells as mentioned above. Furthermore, CD69 is also known to be upregulated by NF-κB signaling at the onset of an immune response. A prolonged immune response is then maintained by the non-canonical NF-κB pathway, which in turn is associated with Treg differentiation.

In addition to Treg differentiation, CD69 is a common marker of precursor and mature resident memory T cells (TRMs) that are localized in peripheral tissues. TGF-β is also responsible for the development of TRMs, thus promoting TRM differentiation in a manner similar to Treg differentiation.

Lymphocyte migration 
Most lymphocytes express sphingosine-1-phosphate receptors (S1P1-5), which are G protein-coupled receptors located in the cell membrane that bind to the ligand sphingosine-1-phosphate (S1P). S1P is a sphingolipid metabolite that is abundant in the bloodstream and, upon binding to S1PR1, promotes lymphocyte egress from lymphoid organs so they can travel to affected tissues. However, when a T cell is activated in a lymphoid organ through cytokine and TCR signaling, CD69 is expressed and forms a complex with S1PR1 (not S1PR3 or S1PR5). This association is dependent on the interaction between the CD69 transmembrane domain and helix-4 of S1PR1. Following formation of this complex, S1PR1 is internalized and is destroyed within the cell, inhibiting its ability to bind S1P and initiate downstream signaling. This in turn results in temporary lymphocyte retention in the lymph organs. It is thought that retention of lymphocytes in the lymph nodes may increase the chance of successful lymphocyte activation, especially if the initial activation signal was weak. Similarly, CD69 expressed in thymocytes following positive selection may ensure that T cells fully mature in the thymus prior to entering circulation.

Some research has shown that S1PR1 and CD69 co-regulate so that when CD69 is in greater abundance, it results in the removal of S1PR1 from the membrane as mentioned above. However, if S1PR1 is more abundant than CD69, as would be the case in mature T cells, CD69 membrane localization is reduced. In this manner, regulation of CD69 and S1PR1 expression and localization jointly impact lymphocyte egress and migration.

See also 
 Cluster of differentiation

References

Further reading

External links 
 
 

Clusters of differentiation